Sebastian Stoss (born January 14, 1986 in Cairo, Egypt) is an Austrian swimmer, who specialized in backstroke events. He is a two-time Olympian, a multiple-time Austrian champion, and also, a current member of Eisenstädter Swimming Club, under his personal coach Andrzej Szarzynski.

Stoss qualified for the men's 200 m backstroke at the 2008 Summer Olympics in Beijing, by eclipsing a FINA A-standard entry time of 1:59.27 from the European Swimming Championships in Eindhoven, Netherlands. He challenged seven other swimmers on the fourth heat, including three-time Olympians Răzvan Florea of Romania, Simon Dufour of France, and his teammate and two-time Olympic silver medalist Markus Rogan. He raced to fifth place and nineteenth overall by fifteen hundredths of a second (0.15) ahead of Japan's Takashi Nakano with a time of 1:59.44. Stoss also tied his overall position with Hungary's Roland Rudolf.

Four years after competing in his first Olympics, Stoss qualified for his second Austrian team, as a 26-year-old, at the 2012 Summer Olympics in London by clearing a B-standard entry time of 2:00.89 in the men's 200 m backstroke. Stoss raced to second place in heat 1 by a single second behind Turkish swimmer and six-time Olympian Derya Büyükuncu with a second-slowest time of 2:02.91. Stoss failed to advance into the semifinals, as he placed thirty-fourth overall in the preliminary heats.

References

External links
NBC Olympics Profile

1986 births
Living people
Austrian male backstroke swimmers
Olympic swimmers of Austria
Swimmers at the 2008 Summer Olympics
Swimmers at the 2012 Summer Olympics
Sportspeople from Cairo
People from Eisenstadt
Sportspeople from Burgenland
21st-century Austrian people